Samuel Nunataks is a chain of about seven nunataks at the southeast end of the Nimbus Hills, in the Heritage Range. Mapped by United States Geological Survey (USGS) from surveys and U.S. Navy air photos 1961–66. Named by Advisory Committee on Antarctic Names (US-ACAN) for Samuel L. Wilson, meteorological electronics technician at Little America V Station in 1957.

Features
Geographical features include:

 Higgins Nunatak

Nunataks of Ellsworth Land